Stephen Levine may refer to:

Stephen B. Levine (born 1942), American psychiatrist and author
Stephen Levine (author) (1937–2016), American poet, author and spiritual teacher best known for his work on death and dying
Steve Levine, record producer